Jacobus Cornelius "Ko" Janssens (20 December 1889, Rotterdam - 21 August 1970, Epe) was a Dutch boxer who competed in the 1920 Summer Olympics. In 1920 he was eliminated in the first round of the lightweight class after losing his fight to Frank Cassidy.

References

External links
 list of Dutch boxers

1889 births
1970 deaths
Lightweight boxers
Olympic boxers of the Netherlands
Boxers at the 1920 Summer Olympics
Boxers from Rotterdam
Dutch male boxers